This is a list of all hat-tricks scored during FIFA Women's World Cups; that is, the occasions when a footballer has scored three or more goals in a single football World Cup match (not including FIFA Women's World Cup qualification matches). So far, 23 hat-tricks have been scored in 270 matches in the 8 editions of the World Cup tournament.  As FIFA is the governing body of football (soccer), official hat-tricks are only noted when FIFA recognises that at least three goals were scored by one player in one match.

The first hat-trick was scored by Carolina Morace of Italy, playing against Chinese Taipei in the 1991 FIFA Women's World Cup; the most recent (as of ) was by Sam Kerr of Australia, playing against Jamaica in the 2019 FIFA Women's World Cup.

The record number of hat-tricks in a single World Cup tournament is six, which occurred during the 2015 FIFA Women's World Cup in Canada, coinciding with the expansion of the tournament to 24 teams from 16.

Notable World Cup hat-tricks
Carolina Morace was the first player to score a hat-trick in a World Cup match, on 17 November 1991 against Chinese Taipei.
The only hat trick in a Final was scored by Carli Lloyd of the United States in the 2015 final against Japan. This is also the only hat-trick in any World Cup final in normal time, as the only men's World Cup final hat-tricks weren't completed until extra time.
Michelle Akers and Alex Morgan are the only players in World Cup history to have scored five goals in a single match. Akers did this during the 1991 FIFA Women's World Cup match between the United States and Chinese Taipei. Morgan did this during the 2019 FIFA Women's World Cup between the United States and Thailand in group play.
There have been four occasions when two hat-tricks have been scored in the same match.
1999 FIFA Women's World Cup: Brazil defeated Mexico, with Sissi and Pretinha, both playing for Brazil, scoring three goals.
2007 FIFA Women's World Cup: Germany defeated Argentina, Birgit Prinz and Sandra Smisek scoring hat-tricks for Germany. 
2015 FIFA Women's World Cup: Germany defeated the Ivory Coast, Célia Šašić and Anja Mittag scoring hat-tricks for Germany, making Germany the only nation with two two-hat-trick games.
2015 FIFA Women's World Cup: Switzerland defeated Ecuador, Fabienne Humm and Ramona Bachmann scoring six of Switzerland's 10 goals.
The briefest hat-trick to be completed — that is, the shortest time between the first and third goals — is the one by Swiss Fabienne Humm in 2015 against Ecuador. She scored at 47', 49', and 52', making the time between her first and third just 5 minutes.
The quickest hat-trick is by Carli Lloyd, scoring at 3', 5' and 16', playing for the United States in the 2015 Final against Japan. This is also the quickest hat-trick in any World Cup match, as the quickest men's World Cup hat-trick wasn't completed until the 24th minute.
The longest hat-trick to be completed — most time between the first and third goals — is the one by Norwegian Ann Kristin Aarønes in 1995 against Canada. She scored at 4', 21', and 90+3', making the time between her first and third 89 minutes. 
The youngest player to score a hat-trick is Inka Grings at 20 years and 236 days.
The oldest player to score a hat-trick is Cristiane at 34 years and 25 days.

List of World Cup hat-tricks

See also 
 List of FIFA World Cup hat-tricks
 List of FIFA Confederations Cup hat-tricks

References 

Hat-tricks
Hat-tricks
Association football player non-biographical articles
FIFA Women's World Cup